, mostly referred to as just  is an episode of The Transformers released as an OVA (Original Video Animation) in Japan in April 1986. It was created as a promotional video for the new line of 'Scramble City' toys and the cassettes were paired with the toy sets. Despite strong belief (such as that voiced on the 20th Anniversary DVD bonus commentary for the episode), it was not meant to introduce Japanese audiences to the new characters from The Transformers: The Movie (considering Ultra Magnus, Ramhorn, Steeljaw, and Ratbat are the only ones from the film that appear in it). Chronologically, it takes place years before the movie, during the early stages of construction on Autobot City.

Plot
Beginning with a recap of the coming of the Transformers to Earth and the story of Devastator, the OVA then gets its original story underway, as the Autobots are shown to be in the midst of constructing the powerful "Scramble City", overseen by their newest arrival, Ultra Magnus. When the Decepticons learn of this, their combiner robots are deployed to attack, and a battle between them and their Autobot counterparts ensues, focusing on their "Scramble Power" - the interchangeability of the individual limbs - to the extent that at one point, Wildrider of the Stunticons connects to Superion to damage him. At the OVA's conclusion, Scramble City is activated and assumes its robot mode of Metroplex to rout the Decepticons. However, from the ocean depths, the Decepticons' own city, Trypticon, rises.

This cliffhanger was never resolved as no direct sequel was ever produced. An extended commercial, called Scramble City Toys but often mistakenly identified as Scramble City 2, was released, but rather than wrap up the cliffhanger, it retold the OVA through stop-motion animation of the toys themselves, with one addition - the introduction of Galvatron, erroneously presented as one of Megatron's troops, rather than the recreated Decepticon leader himself.

Cast
 Tesshō Genda as Optimus Prime
 Osamu Saka as Wheeljack
 Tomomichi Nishimura as Silverbolt & Superion
 Keiichi Nanba as Blaster
 Banjō Ginga as Ultra Magnus
 Seizō Katō as Megatron & Devastator
 Hirotaka Suzuoki as Starscream
 Yū Shimaka as Bruticus, Onslaught & Thundercracker
 Kōji Totani as Motormaster & Menasor
 Yoku Shioya as Bumblebee & Fireflight
 Takurō Kitagawa as Skydive, Warpath, Mixmaster & Scavenger
 Masashi Ebara as Teletraan 1 & Skywarp
 Shō Hayami as Blast Off, Bonecrusher, Ironhide, Tracks & Spike Witwicky
 Ken Shiroyama as Ratbat
 Toshio Ishii as Jazz & Long Haul
 Issei Masamune as the narrator & Soundwave

Notes
Scramble City is part of the Japanese continuity, but not the American. Scramble City Toys is not part of either, and is simply a toy advert.
For Scramble City the first seven minutes or so of the episode consists of recycled animation sequences from the G1 episodes "More than Meets the Eye" (the three part series pilot) and the eleventh season 2 episode "The Master Builders" in addition to a remixed season 2 opening with Japanese titles and music. A "Scramble City" logo follows, with the next fifteen minutes consisting of new, never-before-seen (to US audiences) animation. The post-ending sequence consists of more stock footage taken from the previously mentioned episodes with music and Japanese titles.
"Scramble City" is included as a special feature on Transformers: The Movie 20th Anniversary Special Edition 2-Disc DVD, although due to rights issues with the entirety of the soundtrack, only a fan commentary (and no subtitles) was provided without full original Japanese audio.
In 2007, "Scramble City" was released with full original Japanese audio and subtitles (with optional fan commentary) on the region 2 "Ultimate Edition" version of the movie. However, the video source for the episode was taken from an unofficial fansubbed copy, with misspelled hard subtitles and a crop all around the picture. Additionally, a poor standards conversion from NTSC to PAL resulted in a green tint on the picture - making it look worse than the unlicensed copies in distribution.

References

Scramble City
1986 anime OVAs
Super robot anime and manga
Toei Animation original video animation
Television shows set in the United States